The 2018–19 season was Vitesse's 29th consecutive season in the top flight of Dutch football, the Eredivisie, and 126th year in existence as a football club. The season covered the period from 1 July 2018 to 30 June 2019.

Squad

Transfers

In

 Transfers announced on the above dates, but were not finalised until 1 July.

Loans in

Out

Loans out

Released

Friendlies
Following the conclusion of the 2017–18 campaign, Vitesse announced they would play Wolfsberger AC, Shakhtar Donetsk, Arsenal Tula and Lokomotiv Moscow in July 2018.

Competitions

Overview

Goal scorers

Disciplinary Record

References

External links
 Vitesse Official Website 

Dutch football clubs 2018–19 season
SBV Vitesse seasons
2018–19 UEFA Europa League participants seasons